Sean McDermott is a baseball coach and former shortstop, who is the current head baseball coach of the UIC Flames. He played college baseball at Indian Hills Community College from 1990 to 1991, before transferring to Lincoln Memorial from 1992–1993. He then served as the head coach of the Viterbo V-Hawks (1996–1998).

Playing career
McDermott attended and played baseball at Indian Hills Community College. He transferred to Lincoln Memorial University. As a junior, he had 3 stolen bases in 5 attempts. His best season came as a senior, posting a .266 batting average, a .404 on-base percentage, 33 runs score, 40 walks and 11 stolen bases. He concluded his playing career with 40 walks, at the time a program record.

Coaching career
Following the conclusion of his playing career, McDermott stayed around at Lincoln Memorial as a graduate assistant for a year, while finishing his degree. The following season he was the head baseball coach at the J. Frank White Academy. McDermott would land his first NCAA Division I coaching position in the fall of 1994, being named an assistant at Princeton. From 1996 to 1998, he served as the head coach of Viterbo University. He led them to a program records, 32 victories in just his second season. During the 1998 season, he led them to a berth in the NAIA Regional Tournament. McDermott would leave Viterbo to become an assistant coach for Mike Dee with the UIC Flames.

On June 15, 2021, Dee announced his retirement, and McDermott was elevated to head coach of the Flames.

Head coaching record

References

External links
UIC Flames bio

Living people
High school baseball coaches in the United States
Indian Hills Falcons baseball players
Lincoln Memorial Railsplitters baseball coaches
Lincoln Memorial Railsplitters baseball players
Princeton Tigers baseball coaches
UIC Flames baseball coaches
Viterbo Hawks baseball coaches
Year of birth missing (living people)